NZ Gardener is a New Zealand gardening magazine owned by New Zealand media company Stuff Ltd. It is published monthly and has a circulation of 300,000.

It was first published in September 1944; the first issue sold 3,000 copies. Jo McCarroll was appointed editor in 2010, taking over from Lynda Hallinan.

Awards and nominations

References

Magazines published in New Zealand
Monthly magazines published in New Zealand
1944 establishments in New Zealand
Magazines established in 1944
Gardening magazines